Headbang Lullaby is a 2017 Moroccan comedy film directed by Hicham Lasri. It was screened in the Panorama section at the 67th Berlin International Film Festival.

Cast
 Aziz Hattab
 Latefa Ahrrare
 Hassan Ben Badida
 Zoubir Abou el Fadl

References

External links
 

2017 films
2017 comedy films
2010s Arabic-language films
Films directed by Hicham Lasri
Moroccan comedy films